Marc Michaelis (born 31 July 1995) is a German professional ice hockey forward who is currently playing for the SCL Tigers in the National League (NL).

Playing career
Undrafted, Michaelis originally played in his native Germany within the Adler Mannheim junior program, before moving to North America to continue his development in the North American Hockey League (NAHL) and United States Hockey League (USHL).

Michaelis continued to commit to a collegiate career with Minnesota State University of the Western Collegiate Hockey Association (WCHA). In four seasons with the Mavericks, two as team Captain between the 2018–19 season and 2019–20 season, Michaelis accumulated 162 points in 148 games. In his senior year, Michaelis led the team in scoring with 44 points in 31 games played and was named as the WCHA Offensive Player of the Year.

As an undrafted free agent and looking to embark on his professional career, Michaelis opted to sign a one-year, $700,000 contract with the Vancouver Canucks on March 20, 2020. In the pandemic delayed and shortened  season, Michaelis made his Canucks debut on March 4, 2021, replacing an injured Elias Pettersson in a 3-1 win over the Toronto Maple Leafs. He appeared in 15 games over the course of the regular season going scoreless.

As an impending restricted free agent, Michaelis was not tendered a qualifying by the Canucks and was released as a free agent. On August 18, 2021, he agreed to a one-year AHL contract with the Toronto Marlies, the primary affiliate to the Toronto Maple Leafs.

On June 28, 2022, Michaelis opted to pause his North American career in agreeing to a one-year contract as a free agent with Swiss club, SCL Tigers of the NL.

International play
Michaelis represented Germany at the 2019 IIHF World Championship.

Career statistics

Regular season and playoffs

International

Awards and honors

References

External links
 

1995 births
Living people
AHCA Division I men's ice hockey All-Americans
German expatriate ice hockey people
German expatriate sportspeople in the United States
German ice hockey forwards
Green Bay Gamblers players
Minnesota State Mavericks men's ice hockey players
Sportspeople from Mannheim
SCL Tigers players
Toronto Marlies players
Undrafted National Hockey League players
Vancouver Canucks players

Minnesota State University, Mankato alumni